is a Japanese football player.

Club statistics
Updated to 20 February 2017.

References

External links

Profile at Vanraure Hachinohe

1983 births
Living people
Association football people from Saga Prefecture
Japanese footballers
J1 League players
J2 League players
J3 League players
Japan Football League players
Omiya Ardija players
Sagan Tosu players
FC Machida Zelvia players
Arte Takasaki players
Zweigen Kanazawa players
AC Nagano Parceiro players
FC Ryukyu players
Vanraure Hachinohe players
Ococias Kyoto AC players
Matsue City FC players
Association football goalkeepers